Elfriede Florin (26 March 1912 – 7 March 2006) was a German actress who was popular in the 1950s and 1960s, and is best known for featuring in the 1958 film Les Misérables.

Filmography

References

External links

1912 births
2006 deaths
Actors from Düsseldorf
German film actresses